The 1993 UCF Golden Knights football season was the fifteenth season for the team and Gene McDowell's ninth as the head coach of the Golden Knights. Earning their eighth winning season in 1993, with a 9–3 overall record, UCF made the playoffs for the second time in four years. Also during the season, the Golden Knights won their first game over a Division I-A team, a 38–16 victory over Louisiana Tech.

Starting in 1993 (and continuing through the 2006 season), the program was nicknamed the "Golden Knights." Before 1993 (and since 2007), UCF's sports programs were simply known as the "Knights." The name change was proposed in 1993 by then athletic director Steve Sloan as a way to boost the popularity of the program and to boost merchandise sales.

At 6-1 by late October, it was the best start in school history. Their only loss early on was to East Carolina, a Division I-A team. The Golden Knights won three of their last four regular season games, finished 9-2-0 and advanced to the Division I-AA Playoffs. The Golden Knights were defeated in the first round by Jim Tressel's Youngstown State Penguins by the score of 56-30. The Penguins would go on to win the 1993 Division I-AA championship.

Schedule

References

UCF
UCF Knights football seasons
UCF Golden Knights football